Nuno P. Monteiro (1971 – May 5, 2021) was a Portuguese-American political scientist. He was Associate Professor of Political Science at Yale University. He was known for his research within the fields of International Relations and Security Studies, in particular on the topics of unipolarity and nuclear weapons.

He was the author of the books Theory of Unipolar Politics and Nuclear Politics: The Strategic Causes of Proliferation (co-authored with Alexandre Debs).

He received a B.A. from the University of Minho, Portugal, and a PhD in Political Science from the University of Chicago. He died on May 5, 2021.

References 

1971 births
2021 deaths
Portuguese political scientists
International relations scholars
University of Minho alumni